Adam Page (born 1991) is a professional wrestler.

Adam Page may also refer to:

 Adam Page (footballer) (born 1997), English footballer
 Adam Page (sledge hockey) (born 1992), American ice sledge hockey player